Karabo Modise (born 20 July 1988) is a Botswanan cricketer and currently plays for the Botswana national cricket team.

In May 2019, he was named in Botswana's squad for the Regional Finals of the 2018–19 ICC T20 World Cup Africa Qualifier tournament in Uganda. He made his Twenty20 International (T20I) debut for Botswana against Uganda on 20 May 2019.

References

1988 births
Living people
Botswana cricketers
Botswana Twenty20 International cricketers